Quevedo may refer to:

Quevedo (surname)
Quevedo, Ecuador
Quevedo (Madrid Metro), a station on Line 2
Quevedo (rapper), Spanish rapper

See also
Club Deportivo Quevedo, football (soccer) club in Ecuador
Metro Miguel Ángel de Quevedo, on the Mexico City Metro
Quevedos, a municipality in the west-central part of the state of Rio Grande do Sul